Oland Brewery, formerly S. Oland & Sons, is a brewing company in Halifax, Nova Scotia, Canada (established 1907), which also acquired Alexander Keith's Brewery (1928), and is now owned by Labatt Brewing Company (1971), itself a unit of InBev. Sidney Oland (gt. grandson of Sidney C. Oland) served as a senior executive of Labatt Brewing Company. 

The Oland family has been active in public life in Nova Scotia.  The long-term CEO of the company Sidney Culverwell Oland made significant contributions to the military, the arts and the cultural life of Nova Scotia. Sidney commissioned the building of Bluenose II.  Victor de Bedia Oland was lieutenant-governor of Nova Scotia from 1968 to 1973. (The Oland family also founded Moosehead beer in 1867, which remains independent.)

Brands brewed at Oland's Halifax brewery include:
 Oland Export Ale
 Schooner Lager
 Alexander Keith's India Pale Ale
 Alexander Keith's Red Amber Ale
 Alexander Keith's Traditional Lager
 Budweiser
 Bud Light
 Michelob Ultra
 Labatt Blue
 Busch
 Busch Ice
 Rolling Rock

See also

 List of breweries in Canada

References
 Labatt Brewing Company http://www.labatt.com/ consulted May 15, 2006

Beer brewing companies based in Nova Scotia
Companies based in Halifax, Nova Scotia
Labatt Brewing Company
Year of establishment missing